Naletale (or Nalatale) are ruins located about 25 kilometres east of Shangani in Matabeleland north, Zimbabwe and just north of the Dhlo Dhlo ruins.

The ruins are attributed to the Kalanga Torwa State and are thought to date from the seventeenth century. The primary monument at the site is a colossal wall constructed from stone masonry. It is highly decorated, featuring all of the designs of the Zimbabwe architectural tradition: chevrons, herringbone, chequers, cords, and ironstone colored bands. The original wall was topped by plinths. The complex also features the remains of the principal hut. It is assumed that this was the residence of the Torwa king. The site was damaged by early treasure hunters seeking gold, but remains one of the best-preserved and most impressive archaeological monuments in Zimbabwe.

Archaeological sites in Zimbabwe
Former populated places in Zimbabwe
Buildings and structures in Matabeleland North Province
Tourist attractions in Matabeleland North Province
Archaeological sites of Eastern Africa